Hamidou is a Francophonic-orthography variant of the Islamic name Hamad, commonly used in Africa that may refer to
Given name
Hamadou Derra (born 1985), Burkinabé football midfielder 
Hamadou Djibo Issaka (born 1977), Nigerien athlete 
Hamadou Karamoko (born 1995), French football defender 
Hamadou Moustapha (born 1945), Cameroonian politician

Surname
Barkat Gourad Hamadou (born 1930), Prime Minister of Djibouti 
Pape Hamadou N'Diaye (born 1977), Senegalese football player